The Eden ministry was formed following the resignation of Winston Churchill in April 1955. Anthony Eden, then-Deputy Prime Minister and Foreign Secretary, took over as Leader of the Conservative Party, and thus became Prime Minister of the United Kingdom. Upon assuming office, Eden asked Queen Elizabeth II to dissolve parliament and called a general election for May 1955. After winning the general election with a majority of 60 seats in the House of Commons, Eden governed until his resignation on 10 January 1957.

History

Formation
In April 1955, Sir Anthony Eden succeeded Winston Churchill as Leader of the Conservative Party and Prime Minister of the United Kingdom, and finally reached the post he had coveted for so long. The original composition of Eden's cabinet was remarkable for the fact that ten out of the original eighteen members were Old Etonians: Eden, Salisbury, Crookshank, Macmillan, Home, Stuart, Thorneycroft, Heathcoat Amory, Sandys and Peake were all educated at Eton College.

He initially retained Rab Butler, with whom he did not get along, as Chancellor of the Exchequer. At the first cabinet reshuffle in December 1955, Eden demoted him to Lord Privy Seal and Leader of the House of Commons. Eden was succeeded as Foreign Secretary by future Prime Minister Harold Macmillan, who, however, only held this post until December of the same year, when he replaced Butler as Chancellor of the Exchequer.

Selwyn Lloyd gained his first cabinet post when he succeeded Macmillan as Minister of Defence in April 1955, and again replaced Macmillan as Foreign Secretary in December of that year. Another future Prime Minister, the Earl of Home, entered the cabinet as Secretary of State for Commonwealth Relations in 1955. Gwilym Lloyd George, younger son of former Liberal leader David Lloyd George, remained as Home Secretary.

Fate
Eden's decision to take military action over the Suez Crisis of 1956 caused major embarrassment for Britain and their French allies. Eden, then already in declining health, resigned as Prime Minister and Leader of the Conservative Party in January 1957. Harold Macmillan was chosen over Rab Butler to succeed as party leader and Prime Minister.

Cabinet

Changes

20 December 1955 reshuffle
Rab Butler succeeded Harry Crookshank as Lord Privy Seal and Leader of the House of Commons. 
Harold Macmillan succeeded Butler as Chancellor of the Exchequer. 
Selwyn Lloyd succeeded Macmillan as Foreign Secretary. 
Sir Walter Monckton succeeded Lloyd as Minister of Defence.
Iain Macleod succeeded Monckton as Minister of Labour and National Service.
Lord Selkirk succeeds Lord Woolton as Chancellor of the Duchy of Lancaster.
The Minister of Public Works, Patrick Buchan-Hepburn, entered the cabinet
Osbert Peake retired and his successor as Minister of Pensions and National Insurance was not in the cabinet.

19 October 1956
In October 1956, Sir Walter Monckton became Paymaster-General, a post which had been vacant since Lord Selkirk's promotion to Chancellor of the Duchy of Lancaster.
Antony Henry Head succeeded Monckton as Minister of Defence.

List of ministers
Members of the Cabinet are in bold face.

Notes

References
Notes

Sources

1950s in the United Kingdom
1955 establishments in the United Kingdom
1957 disestablishments in the United Kingdom
British ministries
Cabinets disestablished in 1957
Cabinets established in 1955
Government
 
Ministries of Elizabeth II